Arablinskoye (Ərəblər) is a rural locality (a selo) in Derbentsky District, Republic of Dagestan, Russia. The population was 2,174 as of 2010. There are 35 streets.

Geography 
Arablinskoye is located 11 km south of Derbent (the district's administrative centre) by road. Nizhny Dzhaglan and Avadan are the nearest rural localities.

Nationalities 
Lezgins, Azerbaijanis, Tabasarans, Aghuls and Dargins live there.

References 

Rural localities in Derbentsky District